Francis Kenny A.S.C. is an American cinematographer.

Background and education 
Kenny is a twice board member of the American Society of Cinematographers and member of the AMPAS Executive Committee for Cinematographers.

Kenny was born in Indianapolis, Indiana, attending schools in Indianapolis, Indiana; Cleveland, Ohio;, Atlanta, Georgia;, New Orleans, Louisiana:, Portland, Oregon;, Seattle, Washington;, and high school in New Orleans, Louisiana. At 16 he entered The University of Texas, Austin, Texas; he later attended Harvard University, Cambridge, Massachusetts; and Hofstra University, in Hempstead, New York. He holds degrees in Sociology, English Literature, and Communications.

His father, Francis Bernard Kenny, graduated from Princeton University, worked for the Shell Oil Company and eventually became Treasure. His grandfather, Herman Adkins, was a test pilot for the government at the Indianapolis Experimental Station (Civil Aeronautics Authority) and flew the NC-11 "flying laboratory." The airplane is now located at the National Air and Space Museum in Washington, D.C. Herman Adkins later built The Happy Landings Resort, Lake of the Ozark in Sunrise Beach, Missouri. Adkins was a member of the secretive club for aviators called The Quiet Birdmen.

Career 

Francis Kenny began his career working on documentaries with the filmmaker David Hoffman whom he met at Hofstra University.

Kenny was the cinematographer on the Academy Award-winning feature documentary He Makes Me Feel Like Dancin. He has photographed commercials and documentaries in Afghanistan, Iran, Pakistan, Israel, Lebanon, Sri Lanka, Australia, Singapore, Sumatra, Korea, Hong Kong, Japan, England, France, Germany, Italy, Norway, Denmark, Sweden, and Morocco. His feature films and television shows include: Justified, Bonnie and Clyde, Steel Magnolias, Finder's Fee, Sweet Bird of Youth, She's All That, Harriet the Spy, Jason's Lyric, Coneheads, New Jack City, and Heathers.

He became an active member of The American Society of Cinematographers in 1996. He served as the Chairman of the ASC Membership Committee from 2001 until 2011. In 2012 he received the ASC Presidents Award.

Personal life 
He currently resides in Santa Monica, California, with his daughter who attends Parsons School of design.

References

External links 
 www.franciskenny.us

American cinematographers
Living people
Year of birth missing (living people)
Harvard University alumni
Hofstra University alumni